Jamia Islamia Bhatkal is an Islamic seminary of Islamic learning located in Bhatkal, Karnataka, India. It was established in 1962 and celebrated its 50th anniversary in 2012.

Jamia was a venue for a conference of All India Muslim Personal Law Board held in 2009 and the Muslim World League's educational convention in 2012.

Library
The library inside the campus is certified by UGC as a research-level facility for Islamic, philosophy and Arabic studies. This library has a collection of 40000 books in Arabic and English, about philosophy, jurisprudence, religion, literature, Islamic law.

See also
Darul Uloom Nadwatul Ulama
Darul Uloom Deoband
Nawayath

References

Universities and colleges in Uttara Kannada district
Islam in Karnataka
Deobandi Islamic universities and colleges
Islamic universities and colleges in India
Universities in Karnataka
1962 establishments in Mysore State
Educational institutions established in 1962